List of Medieval Serbian inscriptions.

Temnić inscription, 11th century
Grdeša's tombstone, late 12th century
Stefan Radoslav of Serbia's ring, 1218–20
inscription of the Church of the Virgin Hodegetria, Mušutište, 1315
Stefan Dušan's plate, between 1331 and 1355
Baldovin's tombstone, after 1345
Đuraš Ilijić's tombstone, 1362
Jefimija's epitaph, Praise to Prince Lazar, beginning of 15th century
Stefan Lazarević's ktitor inscription in Manasija
Despot Stefan Lazarević Memorial
Dimitrije Vojinović's tombstone

See also
Medieval Serbian literature
Stećak

Bibliography

Medieval Serbia
Medieval Serbian epigraphy
Medieval Serbian texts
Serbian